United States invasion of Afghanistan
 War in Afghanistan (2001–2021)
 The American War in Afghanistan: A History is about a book written by Carter Malkasian.